Urbano Zea (basketball)
 Urbano Zea (swimmer)